The Nestea European Championship Tour (or the European Beach Volleyball Tour) is a European beach volleyball tour organised by the European Volleyball Confederation (CEV). It is the highest ranked European series of beach volleyball tournaments.

The tour was previously known as the European Championship Tour, before the CEV 2003 signed a sponsorship deal with Nestea in 2003.

Categories
The European Tour consists of Satellite and Masters events, culminating with the European Beach Volleyball Championships. From the 2018 season onwards, the Satellite and Masters events have been merged into the FIVB World Tour, but are still organised by the CEV.

Challenger and Satellite
The Challenger and Satellite events are a series of grassroots tournaments that serve as a developmental circuit for the FIVB World Tour. These tournaments award less prize money (€4,000–15,000) and FIVB ranking points than Masters events. The Challenger and Satellite circuit was previously organised by the FIVB, who handed over the organising of these events to the continental volleyball confederations in 2009.

Masters
In the 2017 season, Masters events awarded €25,000 in prize money per gender with a 12–16 team main draw.

Medal table by country
Medal table as of September 3, 2008.
This includes the results of every tournament, since the tour began in 2003.

See also
 Beach Volleyball World Tour

References

External links
 Official site

 

 
Beach volleyball competitions
Nestlé
Recurring events established in 2003